The Future Trading Act of 1921 was a United States  Act of Congress, approved on August 24, 1921, by the 67th United States Congress intended to institute regulation of grain futures contracts and, particularly, the exchanges on which they were traded.  It was the second federal statute that attempted to regulate futures contracts after the short lived Anti-Gold Futures Act of 1864. 

The act imposed a tax of 20 cents a bushel on all contracts for the sale of grain for future delivery other than those on exchanges regulated by the U.S. Department of Agriculture that met standards set out in the statute.  Twenty cents a bushel was considered a large sum by the standards of the day.

The Act was held to be unconstitutional by the U.S. Supreme Court in Hill v. Wallace on May 15, 1922.  About four years later, on January 11, 1926, the Court announced a related decision in Trusler v. Crooks.

The Grain Futures Act of 1922 was ruled constitutional in Board of Trade of City of Chicago v. Olsen.

External links
 

Futures markets
United States federal commodity and futures legislation
1921 in law
1921 in the United States